Amuro-Baltiysk is a rural locality (a selo) and the administrative center of Amuro-Baltiysky Selsoviet of Zeysky District, Amur Oblast, Russia. The population was 199 as of 2018. There are 2 streets.

Geography 
Amuro-Baltiysk is located on the right bank of the Urkan River, 52 km southwest of Zeya (the district's administrative centre) by road. Ivanovka and Ovsyanka are the nearest rural localities.

References 

Rural localities in Zeysky District